Patrick de Carvalho Brey (born 5 June 1997), simply known as Patrick Brey, is a Brazilian professional footballer who plays as a left-back for Brazilian club Paysandu.

Career
Brey started his career at Vila Nova in Goiás where he played for three seasons. With the club, Brey won the 2015 Campeonato Brasileiro Série C and was the runners-up of the 2017 Campeonato Goiano. He had a loan spell with Goiânia in the second half of 2017, competing in the second division of Campeonato Goiano. In December 2017, he moved to Tupi to play the 2018 Campeonato Mineiro. Brey and his club reached the championship's semi-final being defeated (and consequently eliminated) by Cruzeiro for 3-1. Due to his highly praised performances in the Campeonato Mineiro, he signed with Cruzeiro itself on April 10, 2018.

On 13 June 2018, Brey debuted for Cruzeiro in a 1-1 draw against Paraná Clube. He came on in the 57th minute replacing the midfielder Federico Mancuello. In this particular match, Brey played as a left midfielder (which is not his original position) and performed well drawing a penalty that led Cruzeiro to tie the match. Since then, he has been used by coach Mano Menezes mostly as a midfielder.

On 1 February 2019, he was presented by Coritiba, having signed on loan for the 2019 season.

On 8 October 2021, he joined Triestina in the Italian third-tier Serie C.

Career statistics

References

External links

Profile at The Final Ball

1997 births
Living people
Brazilian footballers
Association football defenders
Vila Nova Futebol Clube players
Goiânia Esporte Clube players
Tupi Football Club players
Cruzeiro Esporte Clube players
Coritiba Foot Ball Club players
Associação Ferroviária de Esportes players
Centro Sportivo Alagoano players
Paysandu Sport Club players
U.S. Triestina Calcio 1918 players
Campeonato Brasileiro Série A players
Campeonato Brasileiro Série B players
Campeonato Brasileiro Série C players
Brazilian expatriate footballers
Expatriate footballers in Italy
Brazilian expatriate sportspeople in Italy
Footballers from Brasília